The Ciudad Deportiva Andrés Iniesta, is the training ground of Albacete Balompié who are currently playing in the Spanish Segunda División. Occupying a total area of 75,000 m² at the south of Albacete, the construction of the complex was launched in March 1998 and completed in April 2005. The stadium is named after Spanish footballer Andrés Iniesta.

Facilities
 The Central Stadium with a capacity of 3,000 seats, is the home stadium of Atlético Albacete, the reserve team of Albacete Balompié.
 1 natural grass pitch.
 3 artificial pitches.
 Service building with gymnasium.

References

Albacete Balompié
Abegondo
Sports venues completed in 2005